John Lewis (1 February 1889 – 12 February 1976) was a British Unitarian minister and Marxist philosopher and author of many works on philosophy, anthropology, and religion.

Lewis's father, a successful builder and architect, came from a Welsh farming family, and was a very devout Methodist. Young Lewis's social and political views clashed with those of his father. Their quarrels eventually led to his father disinheriting him.

Education and religious work
Lewis was born on 1 February 1889. He attended Dulwich College and University College London, where he earned his Bachelor of Science degree. Having been raised a Methodist, he soon left that church to become a Congregationalist. He studied for the ministry at Cambridge, and in 1916 was appointed to a Presbyterian church in Gravesend, Kent; in 1924, he moved to a church in Birmingham. He earned his Doctor of Philosophy degree in philosophy from the University of Birmingham, specialising in the philosophy of Karl Marx, and becoming a Marxist himself.

By 1929, his left-wing views were too strong for the church he was in and he moved to Ipswich as a Unitarian minister. Here, his leftist political sermons attracted a large youth following, but upset a group of older, more conservative members. Their complaints led Lewis to offer his resignation, to be put to a vote of the membership. In a packed and charged meeting, he received the support of the majority of church members.

Political and social activism
Lewis participated in anti-war political activity starting in 1916. On one occasion, he had to be rescued from an angry crowd. He also became involved in work to support the unemployed, and served on the local Trades Union Council. On one occasion, at Christmas, he led a group of unemployed men who marched to the Town Hall, where the Mayor was holding his formal Christmas dinner. They walked in and sat down, demanding to join the feast.

He also was involved with the Boy Scout movement, running a Scout troop, and authoring training booklets. He acted as a guide for outdoor holidays organised by the Holiday Fellowship. He often went to Switzerland, and took parties up the Matterhorn.

In the 1935 general election he stood unsuccessfully as Labour candidate for Great Yarmouth.

Leftist politics
The Bolshevik Revolution had a great effect on Lewis, and he studied Russian. He became a Christian socialist, and later a Marxist.

In 1936 the Left Book Club, started by the publisher Victor Gollancz, was very popular. Lewis quit his ministry in Ipswich to take on the task of building a national network of discussion groups. The groups brought together in a progressive movement intelligent, literate people who had not found rewarding political action in left-wing parties. Soon there were groups in every town. In effect, the Left Book Club and its groups had become a quasi–political party.

He also became the editor of the British Marxist journal, Modern Quarterly, from 1946 to 1953. He was very interested in polemical writing, and authored many books and articles in a polemical vein on topics of philosophy, social issues, and Marxism. In one exchange of polemics, he took on the French Marxist philosopher Louis Althusser. Althusser's part of the exchange is the article "Reply to John Lewis".

"Reply to John Lewis" first appeared, translated by Grahame Lock, in two numbers of the theoretical and political journal of the Communist Party of Great Britain, Marxism Today, in October and November 1972. As Althusser himself noted: "'Reply': because, a few months earlier (in its January and February numbers of 1972), the same journal had published a long critical article by John Lewis (a British Communist philosopher known for his interventions in political-ideological questions) under the title: 'The Althusser Case'."

Miscellaneous
During the Second World War Lewis was a lecturer for the British Army, working with the Army Education Corps and the Army Bureau of Current Affairs and lecturing on, among other things, Britain's wartime ally, the Soviet Union.

He also taught at several different schools, including a stint teaching biology at Morley College, an adult education college in London.

Lewis died on 12 February 1976.

Works
 How To Run a Patrol   Brown, Son & Ferguson 1914
 How To Run Wolf Cubs  Brown, Son & Ferguson 
 A Boy Scout Troop and How To Run It
 Wolf Cub Star Tests and How To Pass Them
 The Log of the Pioneers
 How To Run A Scout Camp  Brown & Son 1918 
 The Old Testament in the 20th Century  Allen & Unwin 1923
 A Faith to Live By   Williams and Norjak 1931
 Russia in 1932  Pamphlet Christian World 1932
 Christianity and the Social Revolution (Edited with Karl Polanyi & Donald Kitchin) Gollancz 1935
 Textbook of Marxist Philosophy (Ed.)
 Douglas Fallacies: A Critique of Social Credit   Chapman & Hall 1935
 Socialism and the Churches  Pamphlet Gollancz 1937
 An Introduction to Philosophy   Gollancz 1937 then fully revised Watts 1954
 The Case Against Pacifism    Allen & Unwin 1939
 Marxism and Modern Idealism   Pamphlet (Marxism Today Series) Lawrence & Wishart 1944
 The Philosophy of Betrayal (with Reginald Bishop) Pamphlet Russia Today Society 1945
 The Basis of Soviet Philosophy   Pamphlet British Soviet Society 1947
 Marxism and the Irrationalists   Lawrence & Wishart 1955
 Marxism and the Open Mind   Routledge & Kegan Paul 1957
 Religions of the World Made Simple   Made Simple Books 1958
 Science, Faith, and Scepticism   Lawrence & Wishart 1959
 Anthropology Made Simple   Doubleday (publisher) 1961
 Socialism and the Individual   Lawrence & Wishart 1961
 Teach Yourself A History of Philosophy   English University Press 1962
 Man and Evolution   Lawrence & Wishart 1962
 The Life and Teaching of Karl Marx   Lawrence & Wishart 1965
 Bertrand Russell: Philosopher and Humanist   Lawrence & Wishart 1968
 Naked Ape or Homo Sapiens? (with Bernard Towers) Garnstone 1969
 The Left Book Club: An Historical Record   Gollancz 1970
 The Marxism of Marx   Lawrence & Wishart 1972
 The Uniqueness of Man   Lawrence & Wishart 1974
 Beyond Chance and Necessity (Ed.) Garnstone 1974
 Max Weber and Value Free Sociology: A Marxist Critique   Lawrence & Wishart 1975

Notes

References

Footnotes

Bibliography

External links 
 

1889 births
1976 deaths
19th-century Christians
20th-century British philosophers
20th-century Christian clergy
20th-century Unitarian clergy
20th-century Welsh educators
20th-century Welsh writers
Alumni of the University of Birmingham
Alumni of University College London
British Army personnel of World War II
British Marxists
Christian communists
English activists
English Christian socialists
English communists
English Congregationalists
English male non-fiction writers
English philosophers
English Unitarians
Labour Party (UK) parliamentary candidates
Marxist humanists
Marxist theorists
People associated with Scouting
People educated at Dulwich College
Unitarian socialists
Welsh anti-war activists
Welsh Christian socialists
Welsh communists
Welsh Congregationalists
Welsh philosophers
Welsh Unitarians